The term Serbians in English is a polysemic word, with two distinctive meanings, derived from morphological differences:

 Morphology 1: Serb-ian-s, derived from the noun Serb and used interchangeably to refer to ethnic Serbs, thus having a synonymous ethnonymic use.

 Morphology 2: Serbia-an-s, a demonym derived from the noun Serbia, designating the population of Serbia, in general.

In English, the use of term Serbians depends on the context, with demonymic use being more common, but not exclusive.

Demonymic use 
The term Serbians is used in English as a demonym for all citizens of Serbia, regardless of their ethnic, linguistic, religious or other cultural distinctions.

In Serbian, however, the term Srbijanci is also used for ethnic Serbs from Serbia, or in a narrower sense, Serbs from Central Serbia (Serbia proper). The term thus excludes ethnic Serbs in the neighboring countries, such as Bosnia and Herzegovina, Croatia, Montenegro and North Macedonia, for which the common term Srbin is used. In English, the two are commonly used interchangeably, with the term "Serbians" sometimes applied to ethnic Serbs outside Serbia (such as "Bosnian Serbians" for Bosnian Serbs). Likewise, the term "Serbs" has been erroneously applied to all citizens of Serbia regardless of their ethnicity.

The term and usage of Srbijanci is controversial in Serbian-speaking areas.

In Croatian usage, while Srbi is the term for ethnic Serbs, including Serbs of Croatia, Srbijanci are Serbs specifically from Serbia, but because no such distinctions exist for other nations, it is inconsistently applied and the main meaning is to indicate something specific to citizens of Serbia as opposed to ethnicity.

The term is used in the province of Vojvodina.

In response to Tomislav Nikolić using the term Bosanac for Serbs of Bosnia and Herzegovina, Belgrade linguist Ivan Klajn said that this type of demonym and distinction between ethnicity and nationality are only found in Bosnia and Herzegovina and Serbia as opposed to other European countries, even other former Yugoslav republics. 

The 1852 Srpski rječnik includes the following: 

A popular Serbian folk song contains a chorus " ...jelek (vest), anterija (short vest), and opanci (traditional moccasins), is how you recognize a Srbijanac (Serbian)...", describing the Serbian folk costume.

Variant terms like Old Serbians and Southern Serbians were used as designations for populations from historical regions of Old Serbia, and Vardar Macedonia respectively.

See also 
 Demographics of Serbia
 Serbian diaspora
 Prečani (Serbs)
 Pan-Serbians

Notes

References

Literature

External links 
 

  

 
Ethnic groups in Europe